Bagasha Creek is a stream in the U.S. state of Mississippi. It is a tributary to Zilpha Creek.

Bagasha is a name derived from the Choctaw language meaning "small creek".

References

Rivers of Mississippi
Rivers of Attala County, Mississippi
Rivers of Montgomery County, Mississippi
Mississippi placenames of Native American origin